Florence K may refer to:
 Florence K (singer), Canadian singer
 Florence K (steamboat), a steamboat that was operated on Puget Sound from 1903

See also
 Florence K. Murray (1916–2004), Women's Army Corps officer, and Rhode Island state senator and judge